Lathan Moses Stanley Echols (born January 25, 2002), known professionally as Lil Mosey, is an American rapper, singer, and songwriter. He rose to fame in late 2017 with the release of his single "Pull Up". Mosey's debut studio album Northsbest (2018) included his first Billboard Hot 100 charting single, "Noticed". His second studio album, Certified Hitmaker (2019), peaked at number 12 on the US Billboard 200, and contains his 2019 hit single "Stuck in a Dream". In 2020, Mosey released the highest-charting song of his career, "Blueberry Faygo", which peaked at number 8 on the Billboard Hot 100.

In April 2021, Mosey was charged with second degree rape in Lewis County, Washington. The trial began on February 22, 2023. On March 3, 2023, Mosey was found not guilty and acquitted of all charges.

Early life 
Lathan Moses Stanley Echols was born on January 25, 2002, in Mountlake Terrace, Washington, to a white mother and a half-Puerto Rican, half-black father. He was raised by his mother in the north side of Seattle. He began rapping in his early teens and started his music career in the eighth grade. Echols first attended Mountlake Terrace High School, then transferred to Shorecrest High School in the tenth grade. He later dropped out of school following the success of his song "Pull Up", and went on to pursue his career, heading to Los Angeles to record.

Career

2016–2018: Career beginnings and Northsbest 
In 2016, Lil Mosey uploaded his first song, titled "So Bad", to the music streaming service SoundCloud, quickly receiving 50,000 views. On November 13, 2016, Mosey competed and placed fourth at the Coast 2 Coast Live Seattle All Ages Edition.

"Pull Up" was Mosey's first released track and served as his debut commercial single. Its music video reached over 25 million views on YouTube in the first 16 months upon its release. On March 14, 2018, Mosey released his second commercial single "Boof Pack". Its music video was released on the WorldStarHipHop channel, and received over 13 million views on YouTube in just over a year after its release. Around four months later, he released "Noticed" as his third commercial single alongside a music video directed by Cole Bennett. The song peaked at number 80 on the US Billboard Hot 100, while its music video has gone on to become one of the most popular videos on Lyrical Lemonade, amassing almost 290 million views to date. In the video, "Mosey and his friends live the good life as they relax in a luxury apartment, which overlooks a beautiful beach". His fourth single, "Yoppa", was released on October 4, featuring fellow American rapper BlocBoy JB.

On October 19, 2018, Mosey released his debut studio album titled Northsbest, which includes the four previously released singles and seven other tracks. The album's opening track, Kamikaze, was supported by a Lyrical Lemonade music video four days after its release, boosting its popularity and peaking at number 97 on the US Billboard Hot 100. The music video has over 80 million views to date. On December 7, Mosey released a standalone single, "K for Christmas".

2019: Certified Hitmaker
Mosey started off 2019 by releasing the single "Bust Down Cartier" on March 15. Produced by Mosey himself, it was added to the re-release of his debut studio album Northsbest, titled Northsbest (Extended), with that being the only additional song. The song was supported by a Cole Bennett-directed music video on Lyrical Lemonade, garnering over 15 million views to date. Three months later, he released "G Walk", the lead single for his upcoming second studio album Certified Hitmaker. The song features American singer Chris Brown. This was followed up by "Stuck in a Dream" on September 17, featuring fellow American rapper Gunna. The song peaked at number 62 on the Billboard Hot 100, overtaking the number 80 peak of "Noticed". The song's music video, which premiered on Mosey's official YouTube channel on the same day, has amassed over 45 million views to date. On November 5, Mosey released the album's third single, "Live This Wild", accompanied by a music video released a week later. Although it did not chart on the US Billboard Hot 100, it managed to peak at number 80 on the Canadian Hot 100. The music video has over 25 million views.

Certified Hitmaker was released three days later on November 8, 2019, containing the three singles and eleven other tracks.  The album features additional guest appearances from rappers Trippie Redd and AJ Tracey. On November 22, Mosey was featured on "This Ain't That", the sixth track on Trippie Redd's fourth commercial mixtape A Love Letter to You 4.

2020: Rise to mainstream popularity with "Blueberry Faygo" and feature run 
On January 31, 2020, Mosey was featured on "Safe With Me", a song from Puerto Rican rapper Eladio Carrión's debut studio album Sauce Boyz. On February 7, 2020, Mosey released the single "Blueberry Faygo", after it garnered traction and went viral after being leaked on streaming platform Spotify throughout 2019. The song debuted at number 62 on the Billboard Hot 100, tying with "Stuck in a Dream". It later became his highest-peaking song on the Billboard Hot 100, peaking at number 8 and charting well internationally. Certified Hitmaker was reissued on the same day to include "Blueberry Faygo", the only addition on the tracklist. The song's music video premiered a month later on Lyrical Lemonade, and has amassed almost 300 million views since then. It has also gone on to become one of the most viewed music videos on the channel, together with "Noticed". This was notably Mosey's fourth collaboration with Cole Bennett, after 2018's "Noticed" and "Kamikaze", and 2019's "Bust Down Cartier".

On March 11, Mosey was featured on Jamaican record producer Rvssian's single "Only The Team", which also features fellow American rapper Lil Tjay. On June 19, Mosey was featured on Canadian singer Tate McRae's song "vicious". Five days later on June 24, Mosey was featured on "WRONG", the third track on Australian rapper The Kid LAROI's debut commercial mixtape F*ck Love. The song's music video, directed by American social media personality Logan Paul, premiered on September 18 and has been viewed over 60 million times. "WRONG" peaked at number 9 on the US Bubbling Under the Hot 100 and number 98 on the Canadian Hot 100. On June 26, Mosey released the song "Back at It", featuring fellow American rapper Lil Baby, as the first single of the deluxe edition of Certified Hitmaker. The song charted at number 9 on the US Bubbling Under the Hot 100. The deluxe's second single, "Top Gone", was released on August 5, featuring Puerto Rican rapper Lunay. On August 9, Mosey was included on the remix of Past Life, a single by American singer Trevor Daniel, which also features American singer Selena Gomez. The deluxe edition of Certified Hitmaker, marketed as Certified Hitmaker (AVA Leak), was released on August 14, 2020. It includes the two singles as well as three additional tracks. On August 28, Mosey was featured on "Lost Me", the third track on American record label Internet Money's debut studio album B4 the Storm, which also features fellow American rappers Iann Dior and Lil Skies.

On August 30, during an interview with The Hollywood Fix, Mosey teased a new project by playing a snippet of new music. The project was later announced to be a new mixtape titled Universal. The mixtape will act as a transition between Certified Hitmaker, and his upcoming third studio album: The Land of Make Believe. On October 1, Mosey released a video on his YouTube channel celebrating the world premiere of FIFA 21, which doubles as the trailer for Universal. In it, Mosey wears a custom jersey and performs a medley of his songs "Bands Out Tha Roof", "Blueberry Faygo", and "Live This Wild", respectively. A day later, Mosey was featured on "Thug Kry", a song on American rapper YG's fifth studio album My Life 4Hunnid. On October 21, Mosey was included on the remix of "Lets Link", a song by American rapper WhoHeem. On October 30, Mosey appeared on "No Honourable Mention", a song on American rapper Trippie Redd's third studio album Pegasus, which also features American rapper Quavo. This was notably their third official collaboration, after "Never Scared" and "This Ain't That". On November 6, Mosey released the single "Krabby Step" in collaboration with fellow American rappers Tyga and Swae Lee from the soundtrack for The SpongeBob Movie: Sponge on the Run. On November 13, 2020, Mosey released "Jumpin Out the Face", as the originally intended lead single for his upcoming mixtape Universal, along with an accompanying music video. One week later, Mosey was featured on "How We Doin It", a song on American rapper French Montana's mixtape CB5. On December 4, Mosey was featured on "Bussin' Out", the fifth track on American producer DJ Scheme's debut studio album "FAMILY", which also features American singer Ty Dolla $ign.

2021-2022: Delay of Universal and standalone releases  
On January 25, 2021, his nineteenth birthday, Mosey celebrated by releasing "Holy Water", as the second single for Universal. Two weeks later, he released the third single, "Enough", which coincided with a Valentine's Day release. On March 15, he released the fourth single, "Try Me". Its music video premiered the next day, and has been viewed over 13 million times. Soon after, on March 26, Mosey was featured on "Jetski", a single by American record label Internet Money. The song also features fellow American rapper Lil Tecca, with whom Mosey had been feuding with since 2019. Thus the song marked the squashing of their ongoing feud. Being Internet Money's first single of 2021, an accompanying music video was released a day later on Internet Money's official YouTube channel to promote the song, which has garnered over 20 million views to date. "Jetski" has gone on to become Mosey's most successful release post "Blueberry Faygo". After Mosey's rape allegations surfaced in April 2021, he took a three month hiatus from music, before returning with "How I Been" and "Problem Solvin" in July, which were two songs uploaded exclusively on his official YouTube channel. Two months later on September 1, he released a standalone single "Pass Out". On November 9, Mosey uploaded a combined music video for "So Fast" and "Speed Racin", which were two songs from his second studio album Certified Hitmaker, to commemorate the album's two year anniversary. Mosey then released the single "Not The Same God As Mine" on December 10, as his first official single post-allegations. 

This was followed up by multiple singles released in early 2022, including "Ain't It A Flex", "Falling", and "Breathin Again", which were all accompanied by music videos on Mosey's YouTube channel. On April 8, 2022, Mosey featured on the song "Gracias A Dios" from Mexican rapper Natanael Cano's album NataKong. On May 26, Mosey had a guest appearance on "Bipolar", a single by Argentine rapper Lit Killah. On October 6, Mosey announced the release of an EP titled "UNI". The 3-track EP was released two weeks later on October 19, containing the songs "Paid Up", "Drop Top", and "Sick Today". All three songs were followed up with music videos on Mosey's YouTube channel over the next two weeks. On November 7, Mosey announced the release of a second EP titled "VER". It was surprise released on November 29, containing three songs: "Backpack", "Matte Red/Sum He Said", and "Rocket". The music video for "Rocket" was released on November 30. The third and final EP of the series, "SAL", is expected to be released in early 2023. Its release date is currently unknown.

2023: Universal Rollout  
On March 3, 2023, Mosey was acquitted of all charges. On the same day, he posted on Instagram a snippet of the unreleased song "Flu Game", thanking God for bringing "the truth to light". It was released as a single two weeks later on March 17 with an accompanying music video premiering the next day. The music video received over 1 million views in less than 24 hours. "Flu Game" is expected to mark the rollout of Universal, which is likely to be released later this year.

Certified Hitmakers record label 
In 2020, Mosey opened his own record label Certified Hitmakers.

His first signee was Jae Lynx, who released his debut single "Bad Girl Vibes" under the label on November 6, 2020. On January 14, 2021, Lynx released his second single "Regrets" with YNW BSlime.

Musical style 
Lil Mosey is known for his melodic flow and lyrics that are tailored to his life. When asked if the term "mumble rap" applies to him in an interview with Complex, Lil Mosey says "I wouldn't consider myself a mumble rapper, because I don't know what that is. But when I talk, I mumble." Although Lil Mosey does not consider his sound to be similar to Meek Mill's, he does consider the rapper an influence as in an interview with XXL Magazine, he describes how he would always listen to Meek Mill's song "Dreams and Nightmares" when he was younger. When asked in the same interview about what comparisons he has drawn, Mosey responded "Music-wise, they be comparing me to Drake".

Live performances 
Lil Mosey has toured with rappers Smooky MarGielaa, Lil Tjay, Polo G and Smokepurpp. In 2018, Lil Mosey was on tour with Juice Wrld and YBN Cordae, serving as the opening act for Juice Wrld's WRLD Domination Tour. He has also received a co-sign from Lil Xan, and he says his first real live performance as an established artist came when Lil Xan brought him on stage during his concert in Seattle. The rapper also performed at Rolling Loud in 2018. Lil Mosey has also toured with Sauve and Bandkidjay. He has given free performances, such as one in Seattle for a baby toy drive. He  toured Europe, Canada and the US on the Certified Hitmaker Tour.

Rape charge and trial 
On April 2, 2021, Echols was charged with one count of second-degree rape in Lewis County, Washington, for engaging in sexual intercourse with an individual that was incapable of giving consent. He pleaded not guilty. The charge stemmed from an alleged incident on the night of January 5, 2020, at a cabin in Randle, Washington, where Echols had hosted a party. Echols was not an adult at the time of the alleged incident, as he turned 18 on January 25, 2020. In accordance with a pre-trial sexual assault protective order, Echols was ordered not to contact or come within 500 feet of the victim, and was prohibited from possessing firearms or using drugs. Echols faced a minimum of 78 to 102 months and a maximum of life in prison if convicted.

Echols was tried in a joint trial alongside co-defendants Francisco P. Prater and Joshua D. Darrow. Prater was also accused of also raping the woman and Darrow was accused of restraining the alleged victim as Echols and Prater allegedly raped her.

Alleged incident 
Upon being contacted by the Morton Police Department on January 6, 2020, the alleged victim told a detective that she attended the party with a friend and blacked out after drinking White Claw alcoholic beverages and champagne provided at the party. The woman stated that she could not clearly remember the events of the rest of the night, and could only remember walking in her underwear to an upstairs bedroom, being told by individuals that she had sex, and being told that there was video recording of the intercourse. However, she had no memory of the rape. She stated that upon waking up the following morning, she and the friend she came with left the cabin.

On January 9, 2020, the Morton Police Department interviewed the woman's friend, who stated that she had consensual sex with Echols in his car, during which she felt a pain in her legs. She stated that she had a "fuzzy" memory of what happened afterwards, but that the next thing she remembered was multiple men forcing themselves onto her, including a man identified as Francisco P. Prater saying "wake up, wake up, suck this dick, bitch." Prater was also charged with one count of second-degree rape, in tandem with Echols' rape charge. She also claimed that she had bruises on her arm, neck, and inner knee that she did not know the origin of. In a later interview with police, the woman alleged that she remembered waking up to Echols raping her in an upstairs bedroom after she had blacked out.

Trial and acquittal 
On April 21, 2021, a $50,000 warrant was issued for Echols' arrest after he failed to show up for a required court appearance at a preliminary hearing. After a deal was made between Echols and the Lewis County Prosecutor's Office to quash the warrant, Echols appeared in court on April 27. On July 13, Echols appeared at a pre-trial omnibus hearing. Prater was also charged with one count of second-degree rape in tandem with Echols' rape charge. Joshua D. Darrow was named as a third defendant in the rape case in July 2021. Darrow was released on unsecured bail and was also issued a pre-trial sexual assault protective order.

Before the trial, Echols was out on $50,000 unsecured bail. The joint trial alongside co-defendants Prater and Darrow was expected to begin on January 24, 2022, which was then delayed to July 18, then again delayed to December 12, and then set for February 16, 2023. Echols reportedly passed a polygraph test. The trial began on February 22, 2023. On March 2, 2023, Echols was found not guilty.

Discography

Studio albums

EPs

Mixtapes

Singles

As featured artist

Other charted and certified songs

Guest appearances

Notes

References

Further reading 
 10 Seattle Artists Lil Mosey Needs To Hear Before Saying They're All Wack

2002 births
Living people
21st-century American rappers
American Internet celebrities
People from Mountlake Terrace, Washington
Rappers from Seattle
Trap musicians
African-American male rappers
West Coast hip hop musicians
American child musicians
21st-century American male musicians
21st-century African-American male singers
Songwriters from Washington (state)